Chlamydastis platyspora is a moth in the family Depressariidae. It was described by Edward Meyrick in 1932. It is found in Brazil.

The larvae feed on Roupala montana.

References

Moths described in 1932
Chlamydastis
Moths of South America